John Herrick McIntire (June 27, 1907 – January 30, 1991) was an American character actor who appeared in 65 theatrical films and many television series. McIntire is well known for having replaced Ward Bond, upon Bond's sudden death in November 1960, as the star of NBC's Wagon Train. He played Christopher Hale, the leader of the wagon train (and successor to Bond's character, Seth Adams) from early 1961 to the series' end in 1965. He also replaced Charles Bickford, upon Bickford's death in 1967, as ranch owner Clay Grainger (brother of Bickford's character) on NBC's The Virginian for four seasons.

Early years
John McIntire was born  in Spokane, Washington, the son of Byron Jean McIntire and Chastine Uretta Herrick McIntire. He was of Irish descent. He grew up primarily in Eureka, Montana around ranchers, an experience that later inspired his performances in dozens of film and television westerns. Later, he lived in Santa Monica, California.

McIntire studied at the University of California for two years before dropping out.

Career
McIntire began acting on radio in Tarzan and the Diamond of Asher and he met his future wife Jeanette Nolan through their work on radio programs. McIntire played the title role in a Los Angeles radio station's production of The Adventures of Bill Lance and was the first actor to play the title role in the CBS radio drama Crime Doctor. He played Jack Packard in I Love a Mystery and Peter Carter in the radio version of The Lineup. He worked on many episodes of Suspense from the early 1940s. He was the narrator for the radio programs Lincoln Highway, and The March of Time. He can be heard on an episode of the radio version of Gunsmoke on CBS portraying Miss Kitty's estranged father.

He was active in the theatre, before he embarked on a lengthy film and television career as a character actor. He was already 40 when he made his big-screen debut in 1947 in the movie "The Hucksters", but went on to appear in films, often portraying police figures, doctors, judges, eccentric loners or other western characters.

Some of his most memorable roles were in westerns such as The Far Country (1955), with James Stewart, and The Tin Star (1957) with Henry Fonda. In Anthony Mann's Winchester '73, McIntire plays a shrewd card sharp and gun dealer.  He also had an excellent, sympathetic turn as an aging detective in Scene of the Crime (1949), played a police commissioner in The Asphalt Jungle (1950), a sheriff in the 1960 Hitchcock thriller Psycho and a reverend in the 1960 drama Elmer Gantry starring Burt Lancaster, but

Though he technically played a supporting part, McIntire received top billing and his greatest critical acclaim for his portrayal of real-life reform politician Albert Patterson assassinated by the local gangsters in the fact-based crime movie The Phenix City Story (1955).

In the mid-1950s, McIntire moved into television, appearing in anthology series, sitcoms and dramas. He guest-starred as Judson in the episode "Chinese Invasion" of NBC's one-season western series, Cimarron City, with George Montgomery and John Smith. 

McIntire procured a regular role on ABC's Naked City, before his character was killed off. McIntire was cast from January to May 1961 in the supporting role of Pa Canfield in the NBC American Civil War drama The Americans..

Though McIntire had never played the lead in a theatrical film, television provided him with his most prominent and long-running role when in 1961 he replaced the late Ward Bond in the NBC/ABC series Wagon Train, playing trailmaster Chris Hale in more than 150 episodes between 1961 and 1965. His co-stars were Robert Horton, Robert Fuller, Denny Scott Miller, Terry Wilson, Frank McGrath, and Michael Burns.

In 1960, McIntire guest-starred as William Palmer in the series finale, "The Most Dangerous Gentleman", of the short-lived NBC western Overland Trail, starring William Bendix and Doug McClure, his subsequent co-star on The Virginian.
Also in 1960 John starred in a The Twilight Zone episode "The Chaser" where he played a mysterious purveyor of potions. McIntire guest starred twice in the western TV series Bonanza: he played Sheriff Mike Latimer in the 1961 episode "The Bride" and he portrayed Old Charlie Conners in the 1966 episode "Old Charlie". In 1967, he guest-starred in an episode of CBS's short-lived western, Dundee and the Culhane.

McIntire replaced actor Charles Bickford (who had himself replaced Lee J. Cobb) on NBC's The Virginian in 1967 when Bickford died (the second time McIntire replaced the leading man in a television series after the lead died, the first being Ward Bond in Wagon Train). McIntire played Clay Grainger, the brother of Bickford's character for four seasons, a major recurring leading role in a weekly 90-minute western series similar in size and scope to his earlier work on Wagon Train.

He played the supporting role of Judge Parker in Rooster Cogburn (1975), the sequel to True Grit starring John Wayne and Katharine Hepburn, and appeared as Owen Keating in the 1977 television miniseries Aspen. His final film role was in Turner & Hooch (1989).

In 1979–1980, McIntire played Ethan McHenry in Shirley on NBC, and in 1981, he played Sam Whittier on the ABC drama The American Dream.

Starting in 1960 McIntire began appearing with his wife Jeanette Nolan.  Both were in Psycho, he playing a sheriff and she voicing some of the "mother" lines. In the Wagon Train episode "The Janet Hale Story" McIntire and Nolan played husband and wife Chris and Janet Hale. In The Virginian, they also played husband and wife. They both appeared again as husband and wife in The Fugitive (1966) season 3, episode 24, as farm workers with their real life son, Tim. In the 1979 Charlie's Angels episode "Angels on Vacation" they appeared together as Chris Monroe's Uncle Paul and Aunt Lydia. They played a US senator and his wife in the TV movie Goliath Awaits (1981). In the 1984 comic spy adventure Cloak & Dagger, they again played a couple. This time they portrayed sinister spies posing as harmless elderly tourists. They also played the parents of John Larroquette's character, Dan Fielding - "Daddy Bob Elmore" and "Mucette Elmore" - on Night Courts season 2 episode, "Dan's Parents."

McIntire and Nolan also worked together as voice actors. In a 1969 KCET television reading of Norman Corwin's 1938 radio play The Plot to Overthrow Christmas, McIntire played the Devil and Nolan played Lucrezia Borgia. In 1977 they appeared in the Disney animated film The Rescuers, in which he voiced the cat Rufus and she the muskrat Ellie Mae. Four years later, the couple worked on another Disney film, The Fox and the Hound, with McIntire as the voice of Mr. Digger, a badger, and Nolan as the voice of Widow Tweed.

Personal life

McIntire married actress Jeanette Nolan on August 26, 1935, and the couple had two children together, one of whom was actor Tim McIntire. Their daughter Holly McIntire was also an actress, appearing in two episodes of Wagon Train, and later became a photographer.

McIntire died on January 30, 1991 (aged 83) from emphysema and lung cancer at St. Luke's Hospital in Pasadena.

Partial filmography

 The Ramparts We Watch (1940) as narrator, 'Baptism of Fire' footage (uncredited)
 The Hucksters (1947) as Radio Announcer (uncredited)
 Call Northside 777 (1948) as Sam Faxon
 Black Bart (1948) as Clark
 River Lady (1948) as H.L. Morrison
 The Street with No Name (1948) as Cy Gordon
 An Act of Murder (1948) as Judge Ogden
 Command Decision (1948) as Maj. Belding Davis
 Down to the Sea in Ships (1949) as Thatch
 Red Canyon (1949) as Floyd Cordt
 Scene of the Crime (1949) as Det. Fred Piper
 Top o' the Morning (1949) as Inspector Fallon
 Johnny Stool Pigeon (1949) as Nick Avery
 Ambush (1950) as Frank Holly
 Francis (1950) as Gen. Stevens
 No Sad Songs for Me (1950) as Dr. Ralph Frene
 Shadow on the Wall (1950) as Pike Ludwell
 The Asphalt Jungle (1950) as Police Commissioner Hardy
 Winchester '73 (1950) as Joe Lamont
 Saddle Tramp (1950) as Jess Higgins
 Walk Softly, Stranger (1950) as Morgan
 You're in the Navy Now (1951) as Cmdr. W. R. Reynolds
 That's My Boy (1951) as Dr. Benjamin Green
 The Raging Tide (1951) as Corky Mullins
 Westward the Women (1951) as Roy E. Whitman
 Glory Alley (1952) as Gabe Jordan
 The World in His Arms (1952) as Deacon Greathouse
 Sally and Saint Anne (1952) as Alderman Percival Xavier 'Goldtooth' McCarthy
 Horizons West (1952) as Ira Hammond
 The Lawless Breed (1953) as J.G. Hardin / John Clements
 The Mississippi Gambler (1953) as Kansas John Polly
 The President's Lady (1953) as John Overton
 A Lion Is in the Streets (1953) as Jeb Brown
 War Arrow (1953) as Col. Jackson Meade
 Apache (1954) as Al Sieber
 The Far Country (1954) as Judge Gannon
 Four Guns to the Border (1954) as Dutch
 The Yellow Mountain (1954) as Bannon
 Stranger on Horseback (1955) as Josiah Bannerman
 The Phenix City Story (1955) as Albert L. Patterson
 The Kentuckian (1955) as Zack Wakefield
 The Scarlet Coat (1955) as Gen. Robert Howe
 To Hell and Back (1955) as Narrator (uncredited)
 The Spoilers (1955) as Dextry
 World in My Corner (1956) as Dave Bernstein
 Backlash (1956) as Jim Bonniwell
 I've Lived Before (1956) as Dr. Thomas Bryant
 Away All Boats (1956) as Old Man / Film Intro Voice-over
 The Tin Star (1957) as Dr. Joseph Jefferson 'Doc' McCord
 The Mark of the Hawk (1957) as Bruce Craig
 Sing, Boy, Sing (1958) as Rev. Farley Walker
 The Light in the Forest (1958) as John Elder
 The Gunfight at Dodge City (1959) as Doc Sam Tremaine
 Who Was That Lady? (1960) as Bob Doyle
 Psycho (1960) as Sheriff Al Chambers
 Elmer Gantry (1960) (with Burt Lancaster) as Rev. John Pengilly
 Seven Ways from Sundown (1960) as Texas Ranger Sergeant Henessey
 Flaming Star (1960) (with Elvis Presley) as Sam 'Pa' Burton
 Two Rode Together (1961) (with James Stewart and Richard Widmark) as Maj. Frazer
 Summer and Smoke (1961) as Dr. Buchanan
 Daniel Boone (1964 TV series) (1965) Timothy Patrick Bryan - S1/E22 "The Reunion"
 Daniel Boone (1964 TV series) (1965) Timothy Patrick Bryan - S2/E10 "The Thanksgiving Story"
 Rough Night in Jericho (1967) as Ben Hickman
 Herbie Rides Again (1974) as Mr. Judson
 Rooster Cogburn (1975) as Judge Parker
 Challenge to Be Free (1975) as Narrator (voice)
 The Rescuers (1977) as Rufus (voice)
 The Incredible Hulk (1980) as Agent Preston DeKalb
 The Fox and the Hound (1981) as Mr. Digger (voice)
 Goliath Awaits (1981) as Sen. Oliver Bartholomew
 Honkytonk Man (1982) as Grandpa
 Cloak & Dagger (1984), (with wife Jeanette Nolan) as George MacCready
 Diff’rent Strokes (1985) as Mr. Hunter
 Turner & Hooch (1989) as Amos Reed (final film role)

References

External links
 
 

1907 births
1991 deaths
American people of Irish descent
American male film actors
American male television actors
American male radio actors
American male stage actors
American male voice actors
People from Eureka, Montana
Male Western (genre) film actors
Male actors from Montana
University of Southern California alumni
20th-century American male actors
Western (genre) television actors
Deaths from lung cancer in California
Deaths from emphysema
Burials in Montana